Anteaeolidiella chromosoma, common name colorful aeolid, is a species of sea slug, an aeolid nudibranch. It is a shell-less marine gastropod mollusc in the family Aeolidiidae.

Distribution
This species was described from specimens collected in the intertidal zone at Deadman's Island, San Pedro, California. It has also been reported from the Pacific coast of Costa Rica and Japan.

Description
The body of Anteaeolidiella chromosoma is orange, with white spots scattered on the notum. Its rhinophores and oral tentacles are white-tipped.

References

Aeolidiidae
Gastropods described in 1905